Sunken battlecruisers are large capital ships built in the first half of the 20th century that were either destroyed in battle, scuttled, or destroyed in a weapon test. They were similar in size and cost to a battleship, and typically carried the same kind of heavy guns, but battlecruisers generally carried less armor and were faster. The first battlecruisers were developed in the United Kingdom in the first decade of the century, as a development of the armored cruiser, at the same time the dreadnought succeeded the pre-dreadnought battleship. The original aim of the battlecruiser was to hunt down slower, older armored cruisers and destroy them with heavy gunfire. However, as more and more battlecruisers were built, their opponents became ships of their own type, not slower, weaker vessels.

In World War I, the thin armor of British battlecruisers did not serve them well in combat with their better-armored German counterparts and three were lost at the Battle of Jutland in 1916. SMS Lützow, a German battlecruiser, was also sunk during the battle. Five German battlecruisers were scuttled by their crews in 1919 to prevent their seizure by the Royal Navy after the First Armistice at Compiègne in 1918.

Between the World Wars, the Washington Naval Treaty of 1922 limited the number and tonnage of capital ships that could be retained. Many battlecruisers were scrapped during this period, though HMAS Australia, the sole Australian battlecruiser, was scuttled to comply with the treaty. One provision of the treaty allowed nations to convert two battlecruisers then under construction into aircraft carriers and both the Empire of Japan and the United States took advantage of the opportunity. The British also converted all three of their "light battlecruisers" into aircraft carriers even though they were not subject to the treaty. The Japanese rebuilt their four remaining battlecruisers into fast battleships during the 1930s.

World War II took a heavy toll on the remaining battlecruisers, both converted and unconverted. In contrast to World War I, where all four ships were lost to gunfire, only two were sunk solely by guns. Two battlecruisers were sunk by a combination of gunfire and aerial attack, four were sunk solely by aircraft and two were sunk by submarines. Of the three surviving World War II battlecruisers, two were scrapped after the war and one, was sunk by nuclear weapon tests in 1946.

Losses
The first combat losses of battlecruisers occurred during World War I, as a result of the Battle of Jutland between the Royal Navy and the Imperial German Navy on 31 May 1916. The three British ships—, and —were all sunk by magazine explosions, with heavy loss of life.  had been hit several times below the waterline by British shells during the battle and took on a lot of water after the battle. Later that night, Lützow had so much water aboard that she threatened to capsize; the crew was ordered to abandon ship and a German destroyer finished her off with two torpedoes. The next combat losses were a quarter century later during World War II, when the British intercepted a German force attempting to break out into the Atlantic to attack supply convoys. Shortly after the Battle of the Denmark Strait began on 24 May 1941, a shell from the  hit , causing its magazine to explode with massive loss of life. Six months later, the battleship  and the battlecruiser  attempted to intercept Japanese troop convoys approaching the Malay Peninsula. They were spotted by Japanese aircraft en route and sunk by torpedo bombers on 10 December.

Several battlecruisers survived World War I only to be scuttled in its aftermath. The five German battlecruisers that survived World War I—, —were interned at Scapa Flow pending the signing of a peace treaty between Germany and the Allies. The commander of the German ships in Scapa, Rear Admiral Ludwig von Reuter, thought the British were going to seize the ships immediately after the expiration of the Armistice, and preemptively ordered the ships be scuttled on the morning of 21 June 1919 to keep them out of British hands. The Royal Australian Navy scuttled  in 1924 to comply with the terms of the Washington Naval Treaty.

Half a dozen of the surviving battlecruisers (including three under construction) were converted into aircraft carriers during the 1920s.
All three of the s were converted. A clause in the Washington Naval Treaty allowed two ships per signatory to be converted to aircraft carriers, and the United States Navy chose to convert two of its s during the 1920s because of their high speed.  was hit by two bombs and two torpedoes during the Battle of the Coral Sea on 8 May 1942. They only moderately damaged the ship, but, more importantly, they cracked some of her avgas storage tanks. Fumes from these tanks later caught fire and could not be put out; the crew was forced to abandon ship and Lexington was torpedoed and sunk by an American destroyer.  survived the war, but was considered obsolete so she was used as a target for nuclear weapon tests during Operation Crossroads. The ship survived the first test with little damage, but was sunk by the second test on 25 July 1946. The  was another battlecruiser converted into a carrier because of the Washington Naval Treaty. She was struck by three bombs during the Battle of Midway on 4 June 1942 that caused serious fires that forced the crew to abandon ship early that night. By the following morning, it was clear that the ship could not be repaired, and so was torpedoed and sunk.

The four Japanese s were reconstructed as fast battleships during the 1930s. On 13 November 1942, during the First Naval Battle of Guadalcanal,  stumbled across American cruisers and destroyers at point-blank range. The ship was badly damaged in the encounter and had to be towed by her sister ship . Both were spotted by American aircraft the following morning and Kirishima was forced to cast off her tow because of repeated aerial attacks. Hieis captain ordered her crew to abandon ship after further damage and scuttled Hiei in the early evening of 14 November. While failing to detect Washington, Kirishima engaged South Dakota with some effect. Washington opened fire a few minutes later at short range and badly damaged Kirishima, knocking out her aft turrets, jamming her rudder, and hitting the ship below the waterline. The flooding proved to be uncontrollable and Kirishima capsized three and a half hours later. Returning to Japan after the Battle of Leyte Gulf, Kongō was torpedoed and sunk by the American submarine  on 21 November 1944. Haruna was based at Kure, Japan when the naval base was attacked by British and American carrier aircraft on 24 and 28 July 1945. The ship was only lightly damaged by a single bomb hit on 24 July, but was hit a dozen more times on 28 July and sank at her pier. She was refloated after the war and scrapped in early 1946.

The listed battlecruisers are grouped according to causes of the sinking. Within groups, they are listed in chronological order of sinking.

Sunk in combat 

The following ships were destroyed in battle.

Scuttled battlecruisers 
Several battlecruisers were scuttled.

Converted battlecruisers 
Several battlecruisers were converted into other ship types either during construction or after entering service; many of these ships were sunk in combat during World War II.

See also 

 List of battlecruisers
 List of sunken battleships
 List of sunken aircraft carriers
 List of sunken nuclear submarines

Notes

Footnotes

References

External links 
 Maritimequest Battleships & Battlecruisers of the 20th century
 British and German Battlecruisers of the First World War
 Navsource Online

Sunken battlecruisers
Battlecruisers, Sunken